Duncan Mahlangu (born August 8, 1983 in Pretoria) is a South African taekwondo practitioner, who competed in the men's featherweight category. He captured a silver medal in the 68-kg class at the 2003 World Olympic Qualification Tournament in Paris, France, and later represented his nation South Africa at the 2004 Summer Olympics.

Mahlangu qualified as a lone taekwondo fighter for the South African squad in the men's featherweight class (68 kg) at the 2004 Summer Olympics in Athens, by placing second behind South Korea's Lee Won-jae and granting a berth from the World Olympic Qualifying Tournament in Paris, France. He failed to move beyond the opening round in a 7–11 defeat to Guatemalan taekwondo fighter and two-time Olympian Gabriel Sagastume. With his opponent losing the semifinal to Chinese Taipei's Huang Chih-hsiung, Mahlangu denied his chance to compete for the Olympic bronze medal through the repechage rounds.

References

External links

News24 Olympic Bio

1983 births
Living people
South African male taekwondo practitioners
Olympic taekwondo practitioners of South Africa
Taekwondo practitioners at the 2004 Summer Olympics
Sportspeople from Pretoria